A jump ball is a method used to begin or resume play in basketball. It is similar to a face-off in ice hockey and field lacrosse and a ball-up in Australian rules football. Two opposing players attempt to gain control of the ball after an official tosses it into the air between them.

In the NBA, WNBA, and competitions operated by Euroleague Basketball, a jump ball occurs at the start of the game (called the opening tip or opening tip-off), the start of any extra period (tip-off), to settle special situations where penalties cancel out and neither team is previously entitled to the ball, and to settle any held balls. Held balls occur when two opposing players both lay equal claim to the ball, and after trying to wrestle it from each other, end up in a stalemate. A jump ball may also be called if there are different calls by two or more referees.

However, most competitions other than the NBA, WNBA, and Euroleague Basketball use the alternating possession rule to settle all jump ball situations after the opening tip.  This uses a possession arrow on the scorekeeper's table. Whenever such a jump ball situation occurs, possession of the ball is awarded to the team that is moving in the direction of the possession arrow on offense. The arrow then swaps to point to the other team. At the start of the game, the arrow points to the team that lost the opening tip.

The alternating possession arrow rule went into effect in college basketball in 1981. Ever since, it has been controversial. Supporters of the possession arrow believe that jump balls give the team with taller players and better leapers an unfair advantage over the other, plus the possession arrow (especially in the NCAA Tournament) gives another element of strategy. But those who oppose the possession arrow believe that it has frequently undone a trailing team's defensive effort because it is the other team's turn to get the ball.

FIBA, with recommendation by NCAA Men's Supervisor of Officials Hank Nichols, on the FIBA World Technical Commission at the time, adopted the alternating possession rule in 2003, with a major difference.  In overtime periods, play begins with the arrow.  In other organizations, another jump ball is conducted.

FIBA mandated that ULEB, which operated the EuroLeague and Eurocup before handing responsibility to the Euroleague Company, adopt the FIBA rule in 2005, as part of FIBA's rules being used by the EuroLeague, effective the 2005-06 season.  Previously, the EuroLeague used the NBA jump ball rules. However, the Euroleague Company reinstated the jump ball rule in 2013.

Uniquely, 3x3, a formalized version of halfcourt three-on-three basketball overseen by FIBA, does not use a jump ball at any time in a game. Under current (2016) rules, the first possession is based on the result of a pregame coin toss; the winner can choose to have the first possession either at the start of the game or at the start of a potential overtime. During the game, held balls are automatically awarded to the defensive team.

See also
Rules of basketball

References

External links

 

Basketball terminology
Rules of basketball
Jumping sports

pl:Rzut sędziowski (koszykówka)